Ben Griffin (born 7 March 1986 in Brisbane, Queensland) is an Australian footballer who plays as a central defender. He went to school at Marist College Ashgrove in Brisbane. A talented junior he represented Australia at the under 17, under 21 and under 23 levels. From 2006 to 2009 Ben played for the Queensland Roar (now known as Brisbane Roar) in the A-League. After time away from the game he signed for Pine Hills in the Brisbane Capital League 2 for the 2017 season "wanting to help out with the younger talent".

A-League statistics

1 - includes A-League final series statistics
2 - includes FIFA Club World Cup statistics; AFC Champions League statistics are included in season commencing after group stages (i.e. ACL and A-League seasons etc.)

External links
 Queensland Roar profile

1986 births
Australian people of Irish descent
Sportsmen from Queensland
Soccer players from Brisbane
Association football central defenders
A-League Men players
Brisbane Roar FC players
Living people
Australian soccer players
Brisbane Strikers FC players